John Glencairn Carter Hamilton, 1st Baron Hamilton of Dalzell (16 November 1829 – 15 October 1900), was a Scottish soldier and politician.

Hamilton was born in Marseilles, France, the only son of Archibald James Hamilton, 12th of Orbiston (1793–1834), and was educated at Eton College. He served in the 2nd Life Guards, rising to the rank of commissioned cornet in 1847, lieutenant in 1849 and captain in 1854. In 1856 he was appointed major in the Queen's Own Royal Glasgow and Lower Ward of Lanarkshire Yeomanry Cavalry. Although retiring from the regular Army in 1860, he continued to serve in the Yeomanry until 1885.

He began his political career in 1857 as Liberal Member of Parliament (MP) for Falkirk Burghs, serving for two years. He later sat for Lanarkshire South in 1868–74 and 1880–86. He also served as a justice of the peace, and as deputy lieutenant and vice-lord lieutenant for Lanarkshire.

In 1886, Hamilton was raised to the peerage as Baron Hamilton of Dalzell. He served in William Ewart Gladstone's government as a Lord-in-waiting from 1892 to 1894.

The Hamiltons made large amounts of money in the nineteenth century, as the lands they held in Lanarkshire were sold for coal exploitation. In the late 1850s and 1860s Hamilton was able to greatly extend his home of Dalzell House, a former tower house outside Motherwell, laying out landscaped grounds at the same time.

On 29 March 1864 he married Lady Emily Leslie-Melville (died 1882), daughter of David Leslie-Melville, 8th Earl of Leven, and had issue:

Archibald John Hamilton (1868–1870)
Gavin George Hamilton (1872– 1952), later 2nd baron
Leslie d'Henin Hamilton (1873–1914)
John David Hamilton (1878–1900)

References

1
Hamilton of Dalzell, John Glencairn Carter Hamilton, 1st Baron
Hamilton of Dalzell, John Glencairn Carter Hamilton, 1st Baron
Hamilton of Dalzell, John Glencairn Carter Hamilton, 1st Baron
Members of the Parliament of the United Kingdom for Scottish constituencies
UK MPs 1857–1859
UK MPs 1868–1874
UK MPs 1880–1885
UK MPs 1885–1886
UK MPs who were granted peerages
Hamilton, John Glencairn Carter
1829 births
1900 deaths
People educated at Eton College
Scottish expatriates in France
Queen's Own Royal Glasgow Yeomanry officers
Peers of the United Kingdom created by Queen Victoria